Layton Hollow is a valley in Barry and McDonald County in the U.S. state of Missouri.

Layton Hollow has the name of the local Layton family.

References

Valleys of Barry County, Missouri
Valleys of McDonald County, Missouri
Valleys of Missouri